James Quinn (born January 25, 1957) is a Canadian politician and CEO. Quinn is the president and CEO of the Saint John Port Authority. He was appointed to the Senate of Canada in June 2021, by Prime Minister Justin Trudeau.

References

Living people
1957 births
Canadian senators from New Brunswick
Independent Canadian senators